Jack Blackman (29 January 1920 – 15 June 1978)  was an Australian rules footballer who played for Hawthorn in the VFL during the 1940s. 

Blackman was a centre half back and first played for Hawthorn in 1939. He did not play between 1940 and 1944 due to his war service in the Royal Australian Navy as a lieutenant. When he returned in 1944 he did not miss a game all season and won Hawthorn's best and fairest.

In 1947, Blackman crossed to Victorian Football Association club Preston as captain-coach without a clearance. He played there under throw-pass rules for three years, and he won the J. J. Liston Trophy in 1949.  The following year he transferred to play for Horsham.

References

External links

1920 births
Australian rules footballers from Melbourne
Hawthorn Football Club players
Peter Crimmins Medal winners
J. J. Liston Trophy winners
Preston Football Club (VFA) players
Preston Football Club (VFA) coaches
1978 deaths
Royal Australian Navy personnel of World War II
Royal Australian Navy officers
Military personnel from Melbourne